The Brotherhood of Poland, New Hampshire is an American drama television series created by David E. Kelley that aired on CBS from September 24 to October 22, 2003. The show offers the typical quirkiness and eccentric humor that have become synonymous with David E. Kelley's shows. The Brotherhood of Poland, New Hampshire has been described as "Northern Exposure with middle-aged angst and populated with the sort of oddball supporting characters so typical of the Kelley oeuvre." The show was canceled after five episodes due to low ratings.

Plot
The show focuses on the families of three brothers in fictional Poland, New Hampshire, one the police chief, one the mayor, and one out of work. Local heroes in their youth, they are now tackling grown-up problems such as the economy, their children's educations, and their families. As in most families, the brothers know they'll always have each other to help weather the storms of their changing lives. The show has been compared to Picket Fences, another show by creator David E. Kelley.

Cast
 Randy Quaid as Hank Shaw, the police chief.
 John Carroll Lynch as Garrett Shaw, the mayor of Poland, NH.
 Chris Penn as Waylon Shaw, the brother down on his luck.
 Mare Winningham as Dottie Shaw, wife of Hank. She does not enjoy living in Poland, NH.
 Elizabeth McGovern as Helen Shaw, wife of Garrett.
 Ann Cusack as Julie Shaw, wife of Waylon.
 Angela Goethals as Katie Shaw, daughter of Waylon and Julie.
 Megan Henning as Monica Shaw, daughter of Garrett and Helen.
 Cleo King as Francine Hill, a police officer in Poland who works with Hank.
 Jodi Benson as A Soloist of the Choir

Production
The pilot was filmed in Plymouth, New Hampshire in 2003, as were the exterior establishing shots and main title scenes. Filming of the series was then relocated to Pasadena, California. Brian Haley was originally cast in the role of Waylon Shaw, but was replaced with Chris Penn after filming the pilot episode. Haley's scenes were reshot with Penn, but the pilot was eventually scrapped and never aired.

Episodes

References

External links
 

2003 American television series debuts
2003 American television series endings
2000s American drama television series
CBS original programming
English-language television shows
Television shows set in New Hampshire
Television series by 20th Century Fox Television
Television series created by David E. Kelley
Television series about families